Canada Dry–Gazelle was a Dutch professional cycling team that existed in 1973 and 1974.

References

Cycling teams based in the Netherlands
Cycling teams based in Belgium
Defunct cycling teams based in the Netherlands
Defunct sports teams in the Netherlands
Defunct cycling teams based in Belgium
1973 establishments in the Netherlands
1974 disestablishments in Belgium
Cycling teams established in 1973
Cycling teams disestablished in 1974